"Never End" is Namie Amuro's 16th single on the Avex Trax label. It serves as the lead single for her fifth studio album Break the Rules, and was made specifically for the G8 Summit that took place in Okinawa, Japan that year. Released in July, the song debuted at #2, becoming Amuro's 16th consecutive top 10 solo single. This was Namie's last single to debut with over 100,000 copies in sales until 60s 70s 80s in 2008.

Overview 
The song was commissioned by late Prime Minister of Japan, Keizo Obuchi, who personally asked Tetsuya Komuro to write it for the event. Obuchi stated to Komuro "I want you to write a song that will be loved by many people, a song that gives us a vision of harmony and interaction in the world in the 21st century" . Komuro agreed to do the song and began a process to get to know Okinawa and its music visiting the country time and time again.

In an interview with Time Asia, Amuro stated that she had been asked to sing at the summit by Obuchi at a party during November or December which had occurred after Komuro had already been asked to write the song. As the song itself, Amuro stated in the same interview that she felt the song had many meanings and that people would have their own interpretations of it.

G8 Summit 
"Never End" was used as the theme song to the Kyushu-Okinawa Summit 2000. On July 22, 2000, Amuro and Komuro performed the song at a reception for the event in front of several world leaders including Bill Clinton, at that time the President of the United States.

Humanitarianism 
A portion of the proceeds from the sales of the single were donated to the Japanese chapter of UNICEF.

Accolades 
 Millennium Award (33rd Japan Cable Awards (Nihon Yuusen Taishou))
 Special Prize (42nd Japan Record Awards)

Track listing 
 "Never End (Radio Edit)" (Tetsuya Komuro) – 6:26
 "Never End (Original Mix)" (Tetsuya Komuro) – 6:26
 "Never End (Chanpuru Mix)" (Tetsuya Komuro) – 6:08
 "Never End (Acapella)" (Tetsuya Komuro) – 6:04

Personnel 
 Namie Amuro – vocals
 Wurasoe Shonenshoko Gashodan – background vocals
 Andy Caine – background vocals
 Jennifer Carr – background vocals
 Juliet Roberts – background vocals
 Tetsuya Komuro – piano
 Sadao China – sanshin
 Keiko Higa – taiko
 Nenes – hayashi

Production 
 Producer – Tetsuya Komuro
 Arranger – Tetsuya Komuro
 Mixing – Dave Ford, Tetsuya Komuro
 Mastering – Ian Cooper
 Programing – Akihisa Murakami, Toshihide Iwasa
 Engineering – Eishin Kitajima, Dave Ford, Toshihiro Wako
 Direction – Tetsuya Komuro, Kenji Sano, Kotaro Takada
 Art Direction & Design – Tycoon Graphics
 Photography – Shoji Uchida
 Styling – Kyoko Tsunoda
 Hair & Make-Up – Akemi Nakano

Charts

Oricon Sales Chart (Japan)

Oricon Sales Chart (Japan)

TV performances 
 December 31, 2000 – Kōhaku Uta Gassen

References 

 Kyushu-Okinawa Summit 2000 Reference Materials
 There Were Times I Nearly Gave Up: Japanese pop diva Namie Amuro grows up
NEVER END: Summit Theme Song's Singer and Producer pay Courtesy Call to G8 Chairman

2000 singles
Namie Amuro songs
Songs written by Tetsuya Komuro
2000 songs
Avex Trax singles